The Frankston line is a commuter railway line in the city of Melbourne, Victoria, Australia. The line runs from Flinders Street station in central Melbourne to Frankston station in the south-east, serving 28 stations via South Yarra, Caulfield, Moorabbin, and Mordialloc. The line continues to Stony Point on the non-electrified Stony Point line. The line operates for approximately 20 hours a day (from approximately 4:00 am to around 11:30 pm) with 24 hour service available on Friday and Saturday nights. During peak hour, headways of up to 5 to 10 minutes are operated with services every 10-20 minutes during off-peak hours. Trains on the Frankston line run with a two three-car formations of Comeng, Siemens Nexas, and X'Trapolis 100 trainsets.

Sections of the Frankston line opened as early as 1881, with the line fully extended to Frankston in 1882. A limited number of stations were first opened, with infill stations progressively opened between 1881 and 2017. The line was built to connect Melbourne with the rural towns of Caulfield, Moorabbin, and Frankston, amongst others. Significant growth has occurred since opening, with a plan to extend the Frankston line along part of the Stony Point line to Baxter.

Since the 2010s, due to the heavily utilised infrastructure of the Frankston line, significant improvements and upgrades have been made. Different packages of works have upgraded the corridor to replace sleepers, upgrading signalling technology, the introduction of new rolling stock, and the removal of all level crossings.

History

19th century 
In 1881, the Frankston line began operations on a single tracked line from Caulfield to Mordialloc. In August 1882, operations were extended from Mordialloc to Frankston. The section of track from Caulfield to Mordialloc was duplicated in 1888. In 1883 the line between Richmond station and South Yarra was quadrupled to accommodate an increase in train services due to the opening of Frankston and Sandringham lines.

In 1885, a number of level crossing removal works occurred between Flinders Street station and South Yarra due to an increase in freight and passenger operations. These crossings were removed through a combination of lowering and raising the corridor.

20th century 
In 1910, the remaining track from Mordialloc to Frankston was duplicated. In 1915, the line between South Yarra and Caulfield was quadrupled, as part of level crossing removal works. This section of the line was lowered into a cutting to eliminate numerous level crossings. Power signalling was provided between Richmond and Hawksburn at the same time, then on to Caulfield in 1921.

Electrification of the line to Frankston occurred in three stages during 1922. In March 1922, the section from South Yarra to Glenhuntly station was electrified, with the section to Mordialloc being electrified in June 1922, and the final section to Frankston being completed by August 1922. The electrification of the line allowed for the introduction of Swing Door electric multiple unit trains for the first time.

The introduction of power signalling on the line begun in 1933 with the section from Caulfield to Glenhuntly, with the remainder of the line converted in stages from 1958 to 1986.

Triplication of the line from Caulfield to Moorabbin from two to three tracks was announced by Transport Minister Steve Crabb in 1984, at a cost of $10 million. Construction of the additional track was designed to increase peak hour capacity and to provide express services on the corridor, with time savings of more than 10 minutes from Frankston. Work begun in July that year with a completion by the end of 1985. The intorudction of services on the new track was delayed by two years till June 1987. Further plans announced in the 1970s included the extension of the third track to Mordialloc, however, these plans did not eventuate.

The current bridge over the Patterson River was provided in 1974, replacing the previous trestle bridge.

In 1981, Frankston line services commenced operations through the City Loop, after previously terminating at Flinders or Spencer Street stations. The commencement of operations involved the service stopping at three new stations—Parliament, Melbourne Central (formally Museum), and Flagstaff. The Loop follows La Trobe and Spring Streets along the northern and eastern edges of the Hoddle Grid. The Loop connects with Melbourne's two busiest stations, Flinders Street and Southern Cross, via the elevated Flinders Street Viaduct. From 2021, Frankston line services stopped operating through the loop as part of a timetable restructure.

21st century 

A 2007, restructure of train ticketing in Melbourne involved the removal of Zone 3, with Zone 3 stations being re-classified to Zone 2. This brought the cost of train fares down, improving system accessibility to the public. All stations between Patterson and Frankston were rezoned to Zone 2.

At the 2010 state election, both the Labor Party and the Liberal Party promised to provide a new Premium station between Highett and Cheltenham, to serve the Westfield Southland shopping centre. The station was projected to cost $13 million, and would have two platforms, an information booth, and shelters with a projected usage of 1,400 passengers daily. The project was scheduled to be completed by 2014, however, no progress was made till after the 2014 state election. The new station opened on 26 November 2017 as Southland station. In 2013, the line, along with the Werribee and Williamstown lines, were upgraded as part of the Bayside Rail Project. The upgrade included station refurbishments, track, signal, and electrical upgrades to allow X'Trapolis trains to operate on these lines. 

In 2021, the metropolitan timetable underwent a major rewrite, resulting in all Frankston line trains operating direct between Richmond and Flinders Street before continuing onto the Werribee and Williamstown lines. Under these changes, Frankston services no longer operated via the City Loop.

Future

Level Crossing Removals 
The Level Crossing Removal Project has announced the removal of all 23 remaining level crossings on the Frankston line, to be completed in stages from 2016 to 2029. Different removal packages have been announced in 2014, 2018, and 2022 to coincide with different state elections and to be delivered in stages up until 2029. All of the various removals have involved the rail under or rail over methods, with some crossing closures also undertaken by the Project. At the conclusion of the project, all level crossings between the city and Frankston station will be full grade operated through a variety of methods.

Return to City Loop 

When the new cross-city rail corridor being built by the Metro Tunnel opens in 2025 there will be a reorganisation of the Melbourne rail network. The Victorian Department of Transport and Planning plans to return the Frankston line to the City Loop, with dedicated use of the Caulfield group tunnel track. This will mean Frankston line trains will no longer through-run with Werribee and Williamstown line trains, and will again stop at City Loop stations Flagstaff, Melbourne Central and Parliament. Werribee and Williamstown services would instead continue onto the Sandringham line. 

Stage 4 of the Network Development Plan [for] Metropolitan Rail proposed that the Craigieburn and Frankston lines be joined via a reconfigured City Loop sometime in the 2030s.

Baxter Extension 

In 2013, as part of Public Transport Victoria's Network Development Plan for metropolitan rail, an extension of the Frankston line to Baxter was earmarked to begin in the "long-term", which would equate to at least 2033. In 2018, the Liberal Party announced a project to extend electrified services to Baxter during the 2018 state election. The project would have included the removal of all crossings between Frankston and Baxter, duplication and electrification works, the construction of one (or two) new stations, and the reconstruction of stations along the corridor. The Federal Liberals announced $450 million of joint funding for the project promised between the state and federal governments. The incumbent Andrews Labor government argued that the project wasn't needed, instead prioritising funding to other projects across the state.

A business case commissioned by the government was completed in 2019 with no further progress being made.

Again in the lead up to the 2022 state election, the Liberal opposition supported the electrification to Baxter. The incumbent Andrews government made no commitments to the Baxter rail extension, instead continuing construction on level crossing removal works along the Frankston line. The 2022 state election resulted in another Labor victory, with the Andrews government pushing ahead with these works, with the extension to Baxter remaining stagnate ever since.

Network and operations

Services 
Services on the Frankston line operates from approximately 4:00 am to around 11:30 daily. In general, during peak hours, train frequency is 10 minutes during the peak period while services during non-peak hours drops to 10–20 minutes throughout the entire route. Rather than running through the City Loop, services continue onto the Werribee (express or via the Altona Loop) or Williamstown lines (with varying frequencies). On Friday nights and weekends, services run 24 hours a day, with 60 minute frequencies available outside of normal operating hours.

Freight operations occur (usually) twice-daily, with Qube Holdings operating services to the Long Island steel mills and the Port of Hastings. Trains to Melbourne run approximately at 4 am and during the mid-afternoon, while trains from Melbourne run approximately at midnight and noon. 

Train services on the Frankston line are also subjected to maintenance and renewal works, usually on selected Fridays and Saturdays. Shuttle bus services are provided throughout the duration of works for affected commuters.

Stopping patterns 
Legend — Station Status
 ◼ Premium Station – Station staffed from first to last train
 ◻ Host Station – Usually staffed during morning peak, however this can vary for different stations on the network.

Legend — Stopping PatternsServices do not operate via the City Loop
 ● – All trains stop
 ◐ – Some services do not stop
 ▼ – Only outbound trains stop

Operators 
The Frankston line has had a total of 6 operators since its opening in 1881. The majority of operations throughout its history have been government run: from its first service in 1881 until the 1997 privatisation of Melbourne's rail network, three different government operators have run the line. These operators, Victorian Railways, the Metropolitan Transit Authority, and the Public Transport Corporation have a combined operational length of 120 years. In comparison, the three private operators, M-Train, Connex Melbourne, and Metro Trains Melbourne have had a combined operational period of  years.

Route 

The Frankston line forms a somewhat linear route from the Melbourne central business district to its terminus in Frankston. After Caulfield station, the track again narrows to 3 tracks, which is remain till Moorabbin when the track narrows to two tracks. The centre track is signalled for bidirectional operation, allowing for express trains overtaking stopping trains in the peak direction. After changing from Werribee and Williamstown services at Flinders Street, Frankston line traverses mainly flat country with few curves and fairly minimal earthworks for most of the line. However, between South Yarra and Malvern, the rail corridor has been lowered into a cutting to eliminate level crossings, and between Malvern and Caulfield, the corridor has been raised on an embankment for the same reason. After Caulfield, the line formerly had numerous level crossings, however, all have now been abolished through numerous rail trenches and rail bridges. Remaining level crossings on the line will be removed by 2029 under other level crossing removal works. 

The line follows the same alignment as the Cranbourne and Pakenham lines with the three services splitting onto different routes at Caulfield. The Frankston line continues on its south eastern alignment, whereas the Cranbourne and Pakenham lines takes an eastern alignment towards their final destinations. From Mentone, the line is never more than ~ from the eastern shore of Port Phillip, and runs alongside the Nepean Highway for much of its length. At Frankston station, electrified services terminate with Metro Trains operated diesel services continuing to Stony Point. Most of the rail line goes through built-up suburbs and some industrial areas, with small sections of the line passing through more open countryside, passing by open fields and farms.

Stations 
The line serves 28 stations across  of track. The stations are a mix of elevated, lowered, underground, and ground level designs. Underground stations are present only in the City Loop, with the majority of elevated and lowered stations being constructed as part of level crossing removals. From 2023, Glenhuntly station will be lowered as part of level crossing removal works. In 2025, Parkdale station will be elevated, with Highett, Mordialloc, and Seaford stations being elevated from 2029 for similar works. Aspendale station will also be lowered from 2029.

Infrastructure

Rolling stock 

The Frankston line uses three different types of electric multiple unit (EMU) trains that are operated in a split six-car configuration, with three doors per side on each carriage. The primary rolling stock featured on the line is the Comeng EMUs, built by Commonwealth Engineering between 1981 and 1988. These train sets are the oldest on the Melbourne rail network and subsequently will be replaced by the mid 2030s. Siemens Nexas EMUs are also widely featured on the line, originally built between 2002 and 2005 these train sets feature more modern technology than the Comeng trains. The final type of rolling stock featured on the line is the X'Trapolis 100 built by Alstom between 2002 and 2004, and 2009 and 2020. All of these rolling stock models are widely used on other lines across the metropolitan network and work as the backbone of the network. 

Alongside the passenger trains, Frankston line tracks and equipment are maintained by a fleet of engineering trains. The four types of engineering trains are: the shunting train; designed for moving trains along non-electrified corridors and for transporting other maintenance locomotives, for track evaluation; designed for evaluating track and its condition, the overhead inspection train; designed for overhead wiring inspection, and the infrastructure evaluation carriage designed for general infrastructure evaluation. Most of these trains are repurposed locomotives previously used by V/Line, Metro Trains, and the Southern Shorthaul Railroad.

Planned rolling stock 
From the middle of 2020s, the next generation of the X'Trapolis family of electric EMUs—the X'Trapolis 2.0—will be introduced. This new model will fully replace the existing fleet of Comeng EMUs currently operating on the line currently with new, modern, and technologically advanced trains. The new trains will feature:

 Modernised doors to reduce the boarding times at stations to under 40 seconds
 Passenger information systems to display that train's journey in real time
 Higher energy efficiency to work with a lower network voltage, to fit in line with modern rail systems overseas
 New interior designs including tip-up seating to allow space for wheelchair spaces.
 Designated bicycle storage areas
 Passenger operated automatic wheelchair ramps located behind driver cabs
 6 car fully walk through carriages

Accessibility 

In compliance with the Disability Discrimination Act of 1992, all stations that are new-built or rebuilt are fully accessible and comply with these guidelines. The majority of stations on the corridor are fully accessible, however, there are some stations that haven't been upgraded to meet these guidelines. These stations do feature ramps, however, they have a gradient greater than 1 in 14. Stations that are fully accessible feature ramps that have a gradient less than 1 in 14, have at-grade paths, or feature lifts. These stations typically also feature tactile boarding indicators, independent boarding ramps, wheelchair accessible myki barriers, hearing loops, and widened paths.

Projects improving station accessibility have included the Level Crossing Removal Project, which involves station rebuilds and upgrades and other individual station upgrade projects. These works have made significant strides in improving network accessibility, with more than 68% of Frankston line stations classed as fully accessible. This number is expected to grow within the coming years with the completion of level crossing removal works on the corridor by 2029.

Signalling 
The Frankston line uses three position signalling which is widely used across the Melbourne train network. Three position signalling was first introduced in 1915, with the final section of the line converted to the new type of signalling in 1976.

References

External links
Frankston line timetable
Network map

Railway lines in Melbourne
Railway lines opened in 1882
Frankston, Victoria
1882 establishments in Australia
Transport in the City of Frankston
Public transport routes in the City of Melbourne (LGA)
Transport in the City of Bayside
Transport in the City of Kingston (Victoria)
Transport in the City of Glen Eira
Transport in the City of Stonnington
Transport in the City of Yarra
1500 V DC railway electrification